William Sawers (13 June 1871 – 20 October 1960)  was a Scottish footballer who played in the Football League for Blackburn Rovers and Stoke, as well as with Scottish Division One side Dundee.

Career
Sawers was born in Glasgow and began his career with Clyde before joining English side Blackburn Rovers in 1892. He spent the 1892–93 season at Blackburn where he played in 28 matches scoring 14 goals before leaving for Stoke. He scored five goals in 18 matches for the "Potters" before returning north to Dundee, where he would score 8 goals in 19 matches for the "Dark Blues". He did make one more appearance for Stoke in September 1895 but returned to Dundee that same month, scoring a further 3 goals in 9 matches, before moving to fellow Scottish side Kilmarnock at the turn of the year.

Sawers was capped once by Scotland, in a 2–2 draw against Wales in March 1895.

Career statistics

Club

International
Source:

References

Sources

Scottish footballers
Blackburn Rovers F.C. players
Dundee F.C. players
Stoke City F.C. players
English Football League players
1960 deaths
1871 births
Abercorn F.C. players
Kilmarnock F.C. players
Clyde F.C. players
Association football inside forwards
Footballers from Glasgow
Scotland international footballers
Place of death missing